G-protein coupled receptor 31 also known as 12-(S)-HETE receptor is a protein that in humans is encoded by the GPR31 gene. The human gene is  located on chromosome 6q27 and encodes a G-protein coupled receptor protein composed of 319 amino acids.

Function 

The GPR31 receptor is most closely related in amino acid sequence to the oxoeicosanoid receptor 1, a G-protein coupled receptor encoded by the GPR170 gene. Oxoeicosanoid receptor 1 is the receptor for a family of arachidonic acid metabolites made by 5-lipoxygenase viz., 5-Hydroxyicosatetraenoic acid (5-HETE), 5-oxoicosanoic acid (5-oxo-ETE) and other members of this family of broadly bioactive cell stimuli.  The GPR31 receptor is a receptor for very different arachidonic acid metabolite, 12-hydroxyeicosatetraenoic acid (12-HETE), whose synthesis is catalyzed by 12-lipoxygenase; this conclusion is based on studies that cloned the receptor from the PC-3 prostate cancer cell line and found that the cloned receptor, when expressed in other cell types, bound with high affinity (Kd=5 nM) and mediated the actions of low concentrations of the S but not R stereoisomer of 12-HETE.  In a [35S]GTPγS binding assay, which indirectly estimates a receptor's binding affinity with a ligand by measuring this ligand's ability to stimulate the receptor to bind [35S]GTPγS, 12(S)-HETE stimulated the cloned GPR31 receptor to bind [35S]GTPγS with an EC50 (effective concentration causing a 50% of maximal rise in [35S]GTPγS binding) was <0.3 nM; it was 42 nm for 15(S)-HETE, 390 nM for 5(S)-HETE, and undetectable for 12(R)-HETE.  Importantly, however, we do not known if GPR31 interacts with structural analogs of 12(S)-HETE such as 12-oxo-ETE (a metabolite of 12(S)-HETE), various 5,12-diHETEs including LTB4, and an array of bioactive 12(S)-HETE and 12(R)-HETE metabolites, the Hepoxilins.  Further studies will be needed to determine if the GPR31 receptor is dedicated to binding and mediating the action of 12(S)-HETE more or less exclusively or, like the oxoeicosanoid receptor 1, binds and mediates the actions of a family of analogs.

GPR31 receptor, like the oxoeicosanoid receptor, activates the MEK-ERK1/2 pathway of intercellular signaling but unlike the oxoeicoanaoid receptor does not trigger rises in the concentration of cytosolic Ca2+; it also activates NFκB. GPR31 receptor therefore exhibits the stereospecificity and some other features generally expected from a true GPR receptor.

12(S)-HETE also: a) binds to and activates the leukotriene B4 receptor-2 (BLT2), a G protein-coupled receptor for the 5-lipoxygenase-derived arachidonic acid metabolite, LTB4 and LTB4 metabolites; b) binds to, but rather than activating, inhibits the G protein-coupled receptor for the cyclooxygenase-derived arachidonic acid metabolites prostaglandin H2 and thromboxane A2; c) binds with high affinity to a 50 kilodalton (Kda) subunit of a 650 kDa cytosolic and nuclear protein complex; and d) binds with low affinity to and activates intracellular Peroxisome proliferator-activated receptor gamma.  These alternate binding and cell-activating sites complicate the determination of 12(S)-HETE's dependency on GPR31 in stimulating cells as well as the overall function of GPR31.  The effects of GPR31 Gene knockout in animal models, a technique critical to defining the in vivo function of genes, will be critical to shedding light on these issues.

Tissue distribution 

GPR31 receptor mRNA is highly expressed in the PC-3 prostate cancer cell line and to a lesser extent the DU145 prostate cancer cell line and to human umbilical vein endothelial cells (HUVEC), human umbilical vein endothelial cells (HUVEC), human brain microvascular endothelial cells (HBMEC), and human pulmonary aortic endothelial cells (HPAC). Its mRNA is also express but at rather low levels in several other human cell lines including: K562 cells (human myelogenous leukemia cells); Jurkat cells (T lymphocyte cells); Hut78 cells (T cell lymphoma cells), HEK 293 cells (primary embryonic kidney cells), MCF-7 cells (mammary adenocarcinoma cellss), and EJ cells (bladder carcinoma cells).

Mice express an ortholog to human GPR31 in their circulating blood platelets.

Clinical significance 

The GPR31 receptor appears to mediate the responses of PC-3 prostate cancer cells to 12(S)-HETE in stimulating the MEK-ERK1/2 and NFκB pathways and therefore may contribute to the growth-promoting and metastasis-promoting actions that 12(S)-HETE is proposed to have in human prostate cancer.  However, LNCaP and PC3 human prostate cancer cells also express BLT2 receptors; in LNCaP cells, BLT2 receptors stimulate the expression of the growth- and metastasis-promoting androgen receptor; in PC3 cells, BLT2 receptors stimulate the NF-κB pathway to inhibit the apoptosis induced by cell detachment from surfaces (i.e. Anoikis; and, in BLT2-overexpressing PWR-1E non-malignant prostate cells, 12(S)-HETE diminished anoikis-associated apoptotic cell death.  Thus, the roles of 12(S)-HETE in human prostate cancer, if any, may involve its activation of either or both GPR31 and BLT2 receptors.

The many other actions of 12(S)-HETE (see 12-Hydroxyeicosatetraenoic acid) and any other ligands found to interact with this receptor will require studies similar those conducted on PC3 cells and mesenteric arteries to determine the extent to which they interact with BLT2, TXA2/PGH2, and PPARgamma receptors and thereby may contribute in part or whole to their activity.  Clues implicating the GPR31, as opposed to the other receptors in the actions of 12(S)-HETE include findings that GPR31 receptors do not respond to 12(R)-HETE nor induce rises in cytosolic Ca2+ whereas the other receptors mediate one or both of these actions.  These studies will be important because, in addition to prostate cancer, preliminary studies suggest that the GPR31 receptor is implicated in several other diseases such as malignant megakaryocytis (Acute megakaryoblastic leukemia), arthritis, Alzheimer's disease, progressive B-cell chronic lymphocytic leukemia, Diabetic neuropathy, and high grade astrocytoma.

References 

G protein-coupled receptors